Elmwood Local Schools is a local school district in Northwest Ohio, United States. The school district serves students who live in the villages of Wayne, Bloomdale, Bairdstown, West Millgrove, Cygnet, and Jerry City  located in Wood County. The superintendent is Tony Borton.  The Special Education Coordinator for the district is Brenda Schnitker.  The District Network Administrator is David Fawcett.
Elmwood is the home of the Royals.

History
Elmwood was created in 1957 when the school districts from Bloomdale, Cygnet, Montgomery, and Portage merged.  Bradner was part of the Montgomery district, but refused to join the merger and ultimately wound up with Lakota Local School District in 1959.

Grades 9-12
Elmwood High School
Elmwood High School Principal is currently Ty Traxler.

Grades 5-8
Elmwood Middle School
Elmwood Middle School Principal is Roger Frank.  The middle school is currently working under the middle school concept structure. Beginning with school year 2021-2022, the 7th and 8th grades transferred to a period system, while the 5th and 6th grades remained on a block schedule.

Grades PreKindergarten - 4
Elmwood Elementary
Elmwood Elementary Principal is currently Gary Duelle.

External links
District Website

School districts in Wood County, Ohio
School districts established in 1957